The Union of Working People's Forces – Corrective Movement or UWPF-CM ( | Ittihâd qiwâ al-'amal al-cha'b al-'âmil – al-harakat al-tashihia), also designated variously as L'Union des Forces du Peuple Travailleur – Mouvement correctif (UFPT-MC) in French, the Nasserite Correctionist Movement – NCM (Arabic: الحركة التصحيحية الناصرية | Harakat al-Islahiat al-Nassery) and the Nasserite Socialists (Arabic: الاشتراكيون الناصريون | Al-Aishtirakioun al-Nassery), was a Nasserist political party in Lebanon, which was active during the Lebanese Civil War (1975–1990).

Origins
Led by Issam Al-Arab, the party was formed through a split from the Union of Working People's Forces in October 1974. Apart from Al-Arab, co-founders of the group included Fouad Itani and Samih Hamada.

In founding the new party, Al-Arab condemned the support of the Union of Working People's Forces leadership to the new Egyptian president Anwar Sadat. Al-Arab argued that the Egyptian government under Sadat had abandoned Nasserism. The party joined the Lebanese National Movement (LNM), whilst its mother party Union of Working People's Forces parted ways with the LNM as it sided with the Syrian government.

Military structure and organization
Like other Lebanese Nasserist parties, the UWPF-CM had its own militia, the Nasser's Forces (Arabic: قوات ناصر | Quwwat an-Nasir) or Forces de Nasser in French, whose formation was announced on April 15, 1975. The party and its military wing were supported financially and militarily by the Libyan government.

The UWPF-CM in the Lebanese Civil War
Although small in size, the Nasser's Forces took part in fighting in Beirut, in the Battle of the Hotels, Chyah, on the Ras Nabi-Sodeco axis, at Khandak El Ghamik as well as in combats in Mount Lebanon (Aley, Qmatiyeh and Bdadoun).

However, relations with its LNM coalition partners were strained to the point of the Nasser's Forces battling rival Nasserite parties such as the Al-Mourabitoun in November 1975 over control of the Karantina district in East Beirut.

The party underwent a split in 1978. In an extraordinary congress there was a dispute between Al-Arab, who argued in favour of alliance with the governments of Iraq and Libya, and his opponents led by Hassan Qubaysi. On July 23, 1978 Al-Arab was declared expelled from the party and Qubaysi was named new General Secretary of the party.

The Nasser's Forces continued confronting the Christian Lebanese Front right-wing militias between 1978 and 1982. After the 1982 Israeli invasion of Lebanon and the departure of PLO, the Nasser Forces went underground and supposedly converted itself into a clandestine resistance group.

See also
Al-Mourabitoun
Battle of the Hotels
Lebanese Civil War
Lebanese National Movement
Lebanese National Resistance Front
List of weapons of the Lebanese Civil War
Syrian intervention in the Lebanese Civil War
Union of Working People's Forces

References

Bibliography

 Edgar O'Ballance, Civil War in Lebanon, 1975-92, Palgrave Macmillan, London 1998. 
 Itamar Rabinovich, The war for Lebanon, 1970-1985, Cornell University Press, Ithaca and London 1989 (revised edition). , 0-8014-9313-7 – 
 Marius Deeb, The Lebanese Civil War, Praeger Publishers Inc, New York 1980. 
Paul Jureidini, R. D. McLaurin, and James Price, Military operations in selected Lebanese built-up areas, 1975-1978, Aberdeen, MD: U.S. Army Human Engineering Laboratory, Aberdeen Proving Ground, Technical Memorandum 11–79, June 1979.
Tony Badran (Barry Rubin ed.), Lebanon: Liberation, Conflict, and Crisis, Palgrave Macmillan, London 2010. 
  

1974 establishments in Lebanon
Arab nationalism in Lebanon
Arab nationalist militant groups
Defunct nationalist parties
Defunct political parties in Lebanon
Defunct socialist parties in Asia
Factions in the Lebanese Civil War
Lebanese National Movement
Nasserist political parties
Nationalist parties in Lebanon
Political parties established in 1974
Political parties with year of disestablishment missing
Socialist parties in Lebanon